The Peasenhall murder is the unsolved murder of Rose Harsent,  committed in Peasenhall, Suffolk, England, on the night of 31 May 1902. The house where the murder occurred can be found in the centre of the village, on the opposite corner to Emmett's Store. It is a classic 'unsolved' country house murder, committed near midnight, during a thunderstorm, and with many ingredients of mystery.

Background
Peasenhall is a quiet village in Suffolk. In 1901 most men worked in Smyth's Seed Drill Works and attended the Primitive Methodist Chapel in Sibton. The choirmaster of the chapel was William Gardiner and the choir members included 22-year-old Rose Harsent, a servant at Providence House in Peasenhall employed by Mr and Mrs Crisp.

Mrs Crisp attended the Congregational Methodist Chapel in Peasenhall, known as the Doctor's Chapel, and Rose's tasks included cleaning there. William Gardiner was seen entering the chapel by Alphonso Skinner and a Mr Wright while Rose was cleaning there, and rumours started to circulate - rumours that made their way back to Gardiner's wife and six children. A church investigation ensued, chaired by Rev John Guy but nothing concrete was established. Gardiner threatened to sue the men who had spread the rumours.

Murder
Rose Harsent was found by her father, in the kitchen at the bottom of the stairs leading to her room in the attic. She was lying in a pool of her own blood, throat cut, with gashes on her shoulders and stab wounds. Her nightdress was burned and parts of her body charred as if someone had attempted to set fire to her remains. She had been dead for 4–6 hours. At the autopsy, it was found that Rose was six months pregnant.

Following on from local gossip, the police suspected that Gardiner was the culprit and he was arrested.  He was tried twice in 1902 and 1903, and released after the jury, on each occasion, failed to reach a verdict.

It was alleged that Gardiner was the father of the unborn child.  Gardiner held a position of some prominence in his employment as a foreman at the local seed drill works (Smyth's of Peasenhall). He lived on the main street of Peasenhall with his wife and six children, in a small semi-detached cottage, within sight of Providence House where the murder was committed.

Investigation and aftermath
The police investigated the murder and Gardiner was quickly arrested.  He was tried twice at Ipswich Assizes held in the County Hall. The first trial, beginning on 7 November 1902 and lasting three days, was presided over by Sir William Grantham; the second, beginning on 20 January 1903, by Sir John Compton Lawrance. At each trial, Gardiner was prosecuted by Henry Fielding Dickens and defended by Ernest Wild. Both times the jury was unable to reach a verdict – it was said that at the first trial the jury was split eleven to one in favour of guilty, and the second eleven to one in favour of not guilty. (Since 1974, a single juror's dissent does not prevent the jury from returning a majority verdict, but at the time it did.) The prosecution then issued a writ of nolle prosequi. This was distinct from the usual process of a formal acquittal. The consequence of this is that Gardiner is one of the few people in English history to have been tried for murder and to have no verdict ever returned.

Gardiner died in 1941. As he had not been found either innocent or guilty, he was never formally acquitted. He had remained under a cloud of suspicion up to and following his death.

This case was examined in an episode of BBC One's Julian Fellowes Investigates: A Most Mysterious Murder. Fellowes concluded that the murder was perpetrated by Gardiner's wife, probably due to jealousy. He also speculated that the wife would have confessed if her husband had been convicted.

Popular culture
The story "Blind Man's Hood" by John Dickson Carr provides a fictional explanation of the killing.

Sources
 Robert Church, Murder in East Anglia: A New Look at Notorious Cases, Robert Hale, 1987, pp. 57–75.
 Edwin Packer, The Peasenhall Murder, Yoxford Publications, 1980, .
 Aldred, David L., "Rose of Peasenhall", Ipswich, East Anglian Magazine, Vol. 40, 1981.
 Bresler, Fenton, "The Choirmaster's Ordeal", Sunday Express, 26 May 1968.
 Cooper, Brian, Genesis 38, London, Heinemann, 1964.  (Fictionalised treatment.)
 Dickens, Sir Henry F., Reminiscences, London, Heinemann, 1934.
 Fido, Martin and Keith Skinner, The Peasenhall Murder, Stroud, Alan Sutton, 1990.
 Freeman, R. Austin (ed.), Great Unsolved Crimes, London, Hutchinson, 1935.
 Futter, R. H., 'The Peasenhall Murder', Ipswich, East Anglian Magazine, Vol. 14, 1955.
 Gladstone, Rev. H. H., 'The Unsolved Mystery of Peasenhall', Ipswich, East Anglian Magazine, Vol. 24, 1964.
 Goodman, Jonathan (ed.), The Country House Murders, London, W. H. Allen, 1987.
 Henderson, William, The Trial of William Gardiner, Notable British Trial Series, London & Edinburgh, William Hodge, 1934.
 Jobson, Allan, An Hour-Glass on the Run, London, Michael Joseph, 1959.
 Jobson, Allan, "The Peasenhall Murder", Suffolk Fair Magazine, Vol. 2, 1972.
 Jobson, Allan, Something of Old Suffolk, London, Robert Hale, 1978.
 Kingston, Charles, Famous Judges and Famous Trials, London, Stanley Paul, 1923.
 Lambton, Arthur, Echoes of Causes Celebres, London, Hurst and Blackett, 1931.
 Logan, Guy B. H., Guilty or Not Guilty?, London, Stanley Paul, 1928.
 Parrish, J. M. and J. R. Crossland (eds.), The Fifty Most Amazing Crimes of the Last 100 Years, London, Odhams, 1936.
 Pemberton, Max (ed.), The Great Stories of Real Life, London, Newnes, 1924.
 Reeves, Marshall, "Suffolk Village Mystery", Master Detective magazine, June 1987.
 Rowland, John, The Peasenhall Mystery, London, John Long, 1962.
 Shew, Edmund Spencer, A Second Companion to Murder, London, Cassell, 1960.
 Smith-Hughes, Jack, Eight Studies in Justice, London, Cassell, 1953.
 Villiers, Elizabeth, Riddles of Crime, London, Werner Laurie, 1928.
 White, R. J., The Women of Peasenhall, London, Macmillan, 1969. (Fictionalised treatment).
 Wilkes, Roger, An Infamous Address, London, Grafton, 1989.
 Wilson, Colin, The Mammoth Book of True Crime, London, Robinson, 1988.

See also 
 List of unsolved murders

References

Bibliography
 Robert Church, "Murder in East Anglia: A New Look at Notorious Cases", Robert Hale, 1987, pp. 57–75.
 Caroline Maughan, Julian S. Webb, "Lawyering skills and the legal process" (2nd ed), Cambridge University Press, 2005, pp. 357–360.
 Edwin Packer, "The Peasenhall Murder", Yoxford Publications, 1980, .

1902 in England
20th century in Suffolk
Deaths by stabbing in England
May 1902 events
Murder in Suffolk
Unsolved murders in England
1902 murders in the United Kingdom
Female murder victims